Şerif Gören (born 1944 in Xanthi, Greece) is a Turkish film director. Aside from important movies under his own signature, he is also the winner of the Palme d'Or ("Golden Palm") award in Cannes Film Festival in 1982 for the film Yol, which he had directed on behalf of Yılmaz Güney, who at the time was serving a prison sentence for the murder of Yumurtalık judge Sefa Mutlu.

Gören started his film career as an editor, and then continued as an assistant director to Yılmaz Güney. He and Güney started directing Endişe (The Anxiety) in 1974, in the beginning of which Güney was arrested and sent to prison. Gören continued directing the film, which makes it the first film directed by him. The Anxiety was a successful movie which won six awards at the 12th Antalya Film Festival in 1975 including Best National Film and Best National Director. He directed more than thirty films in a decade. His activities also brought some trouble. As he served as the chairman of the Film Directors Association during 1979-1980, he got arrested in the aftermath of the 1980 military coup. After his release he started directing Yol in 1981.

Filmography 
 Umut (1970) (Hope, co-director for Yılmaz Güney)
 Endişe (The Anxiety) (1974)
 Köprü (The Bridge) (1975)
 Deprem (The Earthquake) (1976)
 İki Arkadaş (Two Friends) (1976)
 Taksi Şoförü (Taxi Driver) (1976)
 İstasyon (1977)
 Nehir (The River) (1977)
 Derdim Dünyadan Büyük (1978)
 Gelincik (1978)
 Almanya, Acı Vatan (1979)
 Aşkı Ben mi Yarattım? (1979)
 Kır Gönlünün Zincirini (1980)
 Feryada Gücüm Yok (1981)
 Herhangi Bir Kadın (1981)
 Yılanı Öldürseler (1981)
 Yol (1982) (The Way, on behalf of Yılmaz Güney)
 Alişan (1982)
 Tomruk (1982)
 Derman (1983)
 Güneşin Tutulduğu Gün (1983)
 Firar (The Escape) (1984)
 Güneş Doğarken (While The Sun Rises) (1984)
 Kurbağalar (The Frogs) (1985)
 Adem İle Havva (Adam and Eve) (1986)
 Kan (The Blood) (1986)
 On Kadın (Ten Women) (1987)
 Polizei (1988, Germany)
 Abuk Sabuk Bir Film (1990)]]
 Amerikalı (The American) (1993)
 Kırık Ayna (2002) (mini) TV Series
 Serseri Aşıklar (2003) (mini) TV Series
 Ah İstanbul (2006)

References

External links
 
Who is who database - Biography of Şerif Gören 

1944 births
Living people
People from Xanthi
Turkish film directors
Best Director Golden Orange Award winners
Golden Orange Life Achievement Award winners
Greek people of Turkish descent
Greek emigrants to Turkey
Directors of Palme d'Or winners